Paulo Sérgio Luiz de Souza or simply Paulo Sérgio (born 11 June 1989 in Rio de Janeiro), is a Brazilian striker And currently plays for EC Santo André.

Career

Flamengo
Paulo Sérgio made his professional Brazilian Série A debut for Flamengo in a 2–4 home defeat to Palmeiras on 13 May 2007. He scored first his professional goal for Flamengo in a 2–2 home draw with Botafogo in the Brazilian Série A on 27 May 2007.

Figueirense
On 26 May 2009, Flamengo loaned Paulo Sérgio to Figueirense, to play in the Brazilian Série B. He had 17 appearances and 3 goals in his loan spell.

Americano
On 26 January 2010 Paulo Sérgio was loaned to Americano to play on the 2010 Rio de Janeiro State League, but he refused to be loaned out and decided to stay with Flamengo.

Return and loan again
In the first game back in the team, scored the winning goal against Botafogo 1-0. However, even after scoring that goal was loaned again, this time for Estoril.

Operário
On 27 February 2013, Paulo Sérgio signed for Operário.

Seongnam FC
On 21 December 2016, Seongnam FC revealed the newest signing, Paulo.

Career statistics
(Correct )

according to combined sources on the Flamengo official website and Flaestatística.
In 2009 Paulo Sérgio played for Figueirense in the Brazilian Série B.
In 2011 Paulo Sérgio played for Náutico in the Brazilian Série B.

Honours

Youth
 Flamengo
Campeonato Carioca de Juvenis: 2006
Campeonato Carioca de Juniores: 2007
Taça Guanabara: 2007, 2008
Taça Rio: 2009
Rio de Janeiro State League: 2007, 2008, 2009

Contract
Flamengo - 11 June 2007 to 10 June 2012.

References

External links
 sambafoot
 Paulo Sérgio at Soccerway
 Guardian Stats Centre
 zerozero.pt
 Pai alvinegro torce por Paulo Sérgio

1989 births
Living people
Brazilian footballers
Association football forwards
CR Flamengo footballers
Figueirense FC players
G.D. Estoril Praia players
Clube Náutico Capibaribe players
Paraná Clube players
Avaí FC players
Criciúma Esporte Clube players
Daegu FC players
Seongnam FC players
Dubai CSC players
Fortaleza Esporte Clube players
Al-Qadsiah FC players
Esporte Clube Juventude players
Campeonato Brasileiro Série A players
Campeonato Brasileiro Série B players
Campeonato Brasileiro Série C players
K League 2 players
UAE First Division League players
Saudi Professional League players
Brazilian expatriate footballers
Brazilian expatriate sportspeople in Portugal
Brazilian expatriate sportspeople in the United Arab Emirates
Brazilian expatriate sportspeople in South Korea
Brazilian expatriate sportspeople in Saudi Arabia
Expatriate footballers in Portugal
Expatriate footballers in the United Arab Emirates
Expatriate footballers in South Korea
Expatriate footballers in Saudi Arabia
Footballers from Rio de Janeiro (city)